Lucas Pointud (born 18 January 1988) is a French professional rugby union player. He currently plays at prop for Brive in the Top 14.

References

External links
Ligue Nationale De Rugby Profile
European Professional Club Rugby Profile
Bayonne Profile

Living people
1988 births
Place of birth missing (living people)
French rugby union players
Rugby union props
Aviron Bayonnais players
France international rugby union players